Jacopo da Empoli (30 April 1551 – 30 September 1640) was an Italian Florentine Reformist painter.

Born in Florence as Jacopo Chimenti (Empoli being the birthplace of his father), he worked mostly in his native city.  He apprenticed under Maso da San Friano. Like his contemporary in Counter-Maniera (Counter-Mannerism), Santi di Tito, he moved into a style often more crisp, less contorted, and less crowded than mannerist predecessors like Vasari. He collaborated with Alessandro Tiarini in some projects. His younger brother, Domenico Chimenti, born in Empoli, was also a painter. Among his pupils were Felice Ficherelli, Giovanni Battista Brazzè (Il Bigio),<ref>
{{cite book | first= Stefano| last= Ticozzi| year=1830| title= Dizionario degli architetti, scultori, pittori, intagliatori in rame ed in pietra, coniatori di medaglie, musaicisti, niellatori, intarsiatori d'ogni etá e d'ogni nazione''' (Volume 1)| publisher=Gaetano Schiepatti |location=Milan | url= https://books.google.com/books?id=0ownAAAAMAAJ| page= 214 }}</ref> Giovanni Battista Vanni, and  Virgilio Zaballi.

Finally, working in a thematic often shunned by Florentine painters, after the 1620s he completed a series of exceptional still-life paintings.

Selected works

 Madonna in Glory with Saint Luke and Saint Ives (1579) – Louvre, Paris
 Sacrifice of Isaac (1590s) – Oil on copper, 32 x 25 cm, Uffizi, Florence 
 Susanna and the Elders (1600) – Kunsthistorisches Museum, Vienna
 Sant'Eligio (1614) – Uffizi, Florence
 Carlo Borromeo and the Rospigliosi Family (1613) –  Church of San Domenico, Pistoia
 Still Life with Games (1620s) – Oil on canvas, 114 x 152 cm, Private collection
 Judgement of Midas (1624) – Pistoia 
 Saint Ives, Protector of Widows and Orphans – Palatine Gallery, Florence
 Adoration of Shepherds (attributed) – 
 Preaching of John the Baptist –  San Niccolò Oltrarno, Florence
 Michelangelo presents his model of San Lorenzo to Leo X (1617–1619) – Casa Buonarroti, Florence
 The Wedding of Caterina de Medici to Henry II Drunkedness of Noah – Uffizi Gallery, Florence
 Saint Clair accepts the veil (vows)  (1620) – Caen, France
 Final Judgement'' – 
 Pala della Concezione – San Bartolomeo 
 "Three Marys At Tomb" – Blanton Art Museum, Austin, Texas

References

External links
Retrospective on Jacopo Da Empoli

1551 births
1640 deaths
16th-century Italian painters
Italian male painters
17th-century Italian painters
Painters from Florence
Italian Mannerist painters